The 2016–17 Korfball League & Promotion Division promotion/relegation play-off is played between the number 8 of the England Korfball league and the top two teams of the Promotion Division North & West and South & East. In North & West Bristol Thunder and Birmingham City qualified. In South & East Croydon and Cambridge Tigers qualified.

Teams

A total of 5 teams will be taking part in the play-off.

Table

Results

Day 1

Day 2

References 

2016 in korfball
2017 in korfball